Os Bruzundangas is a short story book written by Brazilian writer Lima Barreto. It was first published in 1922.

The book satirizes the politics of Brazil by telling about the "trip" the author made to the fictional country of "Bruzundanga" (which represents Brazil), a country overrun by corruption, poverty and ignorance.

References

External links
 Os Bruzundangas, the book
 

1922 short story collections
Brazilian short story collections